Bentworth and Lasham railway station in Hampshire, England was on the Basingstoke and Alton Light Railway between the villages of Bentworth to the south and Lasham to the north.

History
The Basingstoke and Alton Light Railway opened on 1 June 1901, and Bentworth and Lasham station opened the same day. It was designed by John Wallis Titt, and a wind engine supplied the station buildings and cottages with power.

Towards the end of the First World War, the station and railway were closed on 1 January 1917 because it was on a minor line; the rails were taken up for re-use elsewhere.

Following the war, permission was sought to abandon the line because it had been unprofitable, but this was refused by Parliament; instead, the Southern Railway agreed to rebuild the line for a ten-year trial. The light railway and station re-opened on 18 August 1924. It was featured in the 1929 film The Wrecker.

On 12 September 1932, the station was closed to passengers, the line being used for goods until its final closure in June 1936.  The corrugated-iron platform building and waiting room survived until its demolition in 2003, and  the remains of the platform edge can still be seen.

References

External links 

  Photograph of the station site in 1989 with corrugated iron station building on right

Disused railway stations in Hampshire
Former London and South Western Railway stations
Railway stations in Great Britain opened in 1901
Railway stations in Great Britain closed in 1917
Railway stations in Great Britain opened in 1924
Railway stations in Great Britain closed in 1936